Stevan Bena (Serbian Cyrillic: Стеван Бена; 23 August 1935 – 5 May 2012) was a Serbian footballer. He played for TSV 1860 Munich, playing in the UEFA Cup Winners' Cup at the Wembley Stadium in London in 1965, which was won by West Ham United (2–0).

References

External links
 
 Obituary

1935 births
2012 deaths
Sportspeople from Pančevo
Serbian footballers
Yugoslav footballers
Yugoslav expatriate footballers
Yugoslavia international footballers
Association football midfielders
FK Vojvodina players
OFK Beograd players
Yugoslav First League players
Bundesliga players
TSV 1860 Munich players
Hannover 96 players
North American Soccer League (1968–1984) players
Oakland Clippers players
Dallas Tornado players
Yugoslav expatriate sportspeople in the United States
Serbian football managers
Yugoslav expatriate sportspeople in West Germany
Expatriate soccer players in the United States
Expatriate footballers in West Germany
Yugoslav football managers
Yugoslav expatriate football managers
Yugoslav expatriate sportspeople in Malaysia
Expatriate football managers in Malaysia